Wingmead is a large farm and country estate in eastern Prairie County, Arkansas. Its main house, built about 1939, is one of the state's grandest examples of Colonial Revival architecture. The estate includes several features related to nature conservation and hunting, particularly Peckerwood Lake, a  lake created by Queeny to promote duck habitat.

The property was listed on the National Register of Historic Places in 2011.

See also
National Register of Historic Places listings in Prairie County, Arkansas

References

Houses on the National Register of Historic Places in Arkansas
Colonial Revival architecture in Arkansas
Houses completed in 1939
Houses in Prairie County, Arkansas
National Register of Historic Places in Prairie County, Arkansas
1939 establishments in Arkansas